Paul Capdeville and Marcel Felder won the first edition of the tournament by defeating André Ghem and João Pedro Sorgi 7–5, 6–3 in the final.

Seeds

Draw

Draw

References
 Main Draw

IS Open de Tenis - Doubles
2012 Doubles